All India Institute of Hygiene and Public Health  (AIIH&PH) is a pioneering Indian institute for research and training in public health and allied sciences in Kolkata. It was established on 30 December 1932 with assistance from the Rockefeller Foundation. It functions under  Director General of Health Services, New Delhi, Ministry of Health & Family Welfare, Government of India and is now affiliated with West Bengal University of Health Sciences, established in 2003.It also has a rural training centre in Singur and urban training centre in Chetla.

In 1943, in borehole latrine was developed by AIIH&PH in collaboration with the Rockefeller Foundation.

History
Established with the aid of Rockefeller Foundation, AIIH&PH was inaugurated by Sir John Anderson, the Governor of Bengal on 30 December 1932. The AIIH&PH was a constituent college of the University of Calcutta. Since its inception, the college has collaborated with the Calcutta School of Tropical Medicine. In 1953, the Institute was accredited by WHO and UNICEF as an International Training Centre. The institute carried out the first village health survey in India in 1944-1945, in which a general health survey of nearly 1200 families comprising 7000 members in West Bengal was done. After independence, extension plans were drawn in 1950, at a cost of 90 lakhs, shared equally by Union Health Ministry and United Nations International Children's Emergency Fund, to build a Child and Maternity Health section at the institute.

In 1995, a public health scientist Dr. Smarajit Jana of AIIH&PH for Durbar Mahila Samanwaya Committee, sex worker's organisation which works for prevention of HIV/AIDS amongst its 65,000 sex workers. In  2004, the AIIH&PH got affiliated to the newly formed West Bengal University of Health Sciences (WBUHS).

Departments
 Bio-Chemistry and Nutrition
 Epidemiology
 Health Education
 Maternal and Child Health
 Microbiology
 Occupational Health
 Public Health Administration
 Public Health Nursing
 Environmental Sanitation and Sanitary Engineering
 Preventive and Social Medicine
 Statistics
Behavioural Sciences

It is also one of the nine institutions in India, which offer Post-Graduate Diploma in Public Health Management. While the main campus is at Chittaranjan Avenue, in 2011 its second campus at Salt Lake City, Kolkata also became operational.

Notable faculty
 Chidambara Chandrasekaran, Indian demographer and statistician

See also
List of institutions of higher education in West Bengal
Education in India
Education in West Bengal

References

External links
 

1932 establishments in India
Affiliates of West Bengal University of Health Sciences
Medical colleges in West Bengal
Public health organisations based in India
Research institutes in Kolkata
Medical research institutes in India
Research institutes established in 1932
Schools of public health
Educational institutions established in 1932